Revati Lele is an Indian television actress and a Kathak dancer. She started her acting career with episodic Gulmohar on Zee Yuva. Later, she worked in Indian television drama Vithu Mauli, Vartul and Lalit 205 etc.

Career
In 2020, she essayed the role of Ramabai Peshwa in the television serial Swamini on Colors Marathi. In 2021, she stepped into Hindi television industry with the show Aapki Nazron Ne Samjha on StarPlus in which she played the character Bansuri. She also acted in Marathi serial Lagnachi Bedi on Star Pravah channel.

Revati Lele is also a Kathak dancer and a performer. She has completed her Nritya Visharad under Tina Tambe. She has been a part of Broadway style musical Mughal-e-Azam directed by Feroz Abbas Khan.

Television

References

External links
 

Living people

Year of birth missing (living people)
Indian actresses